Goronwy Rees (29 November 1909 – 12 December 1979) was a Welsh journalist, academic and writer.

Background
Rees was born in Aberystwyth, where his father was minister of the Tabernacle Calvinistic Methodist Church. The family later moved to Roath, Cardiff, and Goronwy was educated at Cardiff High School for Boys. He received three scholarships in 1927 to attend New College, Oxford, where he studied History. In 1931 he became a Fellow of All Souls College.

Career
After leaving university, Rees wrote first for the Manchester Guardian. In 1936, he became assistant editor of The Spectator, for which he travelled to Germany, Russia, Spain, and Czechoslovakia. Though a Marxist during most of the 1930s, the Hitler-Stalin Pact turned him from communism and led him to enlist before the UK entered the war. During World War II, he joined the Royal Artillery and rose to second lieutenant in the Royal Welch Fusiliers. By 1943 he had risen further to the rank of Major on the staff of Lieutenant General Sir Frederick Morgan, COSSAC (Chief of Staff to the Supreme Allied Commander), the office responsible for planning Operation Overlord.  After the army, he resumed work at The Spectator. In 1946, he then became an administrator for H. Pontifex & Son and may have started working for MI6. Rees's daughter confirms that he worked for MI6 then and until at least 1949: "...And in the afternoons he went to 54 Broadway, next door to St. James's Park tube station, the offices of SIS (or MI6), where he worked for the Political Section which... assessed and evaluated information..."
 
In 1953, Rees became principal of the University College of Wales in Aberystwyth. In 1956, a series of articles appeared in The People. They described their anonymous author as a "Most intimate friend, a man in a high academic position." Guy Burgess appeared in them as a corrupt man, spy, blackmailer, homosexual, and drunk. The Daily Telegraph then revealed Rees was author. The university held an inquiry into the matter (1956-1957).  Despite student support, university staff did not support him.  Rees resigned before the inquiry ended, thus also ending his academic career. The inquiry's report was very critical of Rees. Moreover, "It turned out that a great many old acquaintances of Burgess and [Donald] Maclean were much more horrified – felt, indeed, much more betrayed – by the fact that the late Goronwy Rees gave a version of their flight to the People than by the flight itself. When Stephen Spender showed the Daily Express a friend’s letter about Burgess, he was held to have disgraced himself."

Rees sat on the Departmental Committee on Homosexual Offences and Prostitution and played an influential role in getting the testimony of gay men heard. He spent the last years of his life in Aberystwyth. He wrote a column (signed "R") on current political affairs for Encounter. He also wrote two autobiographies, A Bundle of Sensations (1960) and A Chapter of Accidents (1972).

He appears under the name "Eddie" in Elizabeth Bowen's novel The Death of the Heart (1938) (Victoria Glendinning Elizabeth Bowen: Portrait of a Writer.)

Rees died of cancer on 12 December 1979 at Charing Cross Hospital in London.

Communism and anti-communism
During the 1930s, Rees was a Marxist intellectual. He came into contact with the Cambridge Five spy ring through friend Guy Burgess.

The Hitler-Stalin Pact led him to take a strong anti-communist stance, which he put into writing by 1948:  "A spectre is haunting Europe." The words are more true today than they were when two hopeful young men wrote them almost exactly one hundred years ago. Today the spectre has ceased to be a bogy. It is a solid, established fact, ruling some 250,000,000 people and preparing, with admirable thoroughness, advanced positions from which it can reach out to extend its rule over Western Europe.) In her memoir, daughter Jenny Rees wrote that Rees her father was fascinated by the Hiss-Chambers Case in America (1948-1950), which marked a sharp divide intellectually between him and Burgess:  'Hiss was certainly guilty; he was precisely the sort of person who was capable of carrying out the systematic program of espionage which Whittaker Chambers, so improbably as it seemed, had accused him; and only a communist could be capable of such a feat...' But according to Guy, it was Hiss, not Chambers, who deserved the admiration. He seemed acutely conscious of the parallels of the Hiss Case with the Cambridge Five (specifically Burgess) when he wrote "I have no intention to be the British Whittaker Chambers." (Others have made the comparison.) He reviewed Chambers's memoir Witness (1952) favorably for The Spectator. 
At the end of his life he admitted spying for the USSR for a short time, and accused MI5 man Guy Liddell of also being a spy. His son Thomas has said that his father did not admit to being a communist spy, even when he was dying in hospital in 1979. However, Rees told Andrew Boyle, author of The Climate of Treason, his reflections on conversations held at All Souls College with Guy Burgess, his great friend. He told Boyle that he had ridiculed Guy Burgess's claim to be a spy. He also told Boyle that Anthony Blunt was the man to follow. Boyle's revelations in the Daily Mail led to the Prime Minister  Margaret Thatcher announcing to the House of Commons in 1979 that the security services had long known that Blunt was a spy, due to Goronwy Rees's warnings to the security services the weekend that Burgess and Maclean fled to Russia.  Nevertheless, Blunt had been knighted.

In 1999, Vasili Mitrokhin, former KGB member, published the Mitrokhin archives that included a file on Rees, documenting his recruitment by Burgess at Oxford during the mid-1930s and two code names, "Fleet" and "Gross."  The file also notes that he supplied no information to the Soviets and that he abandoned his communist affiliation at the outbreak of World War II.

In her memoir, daughter Jenny relates that she learned the following from Oleg Tsarev while visiting Moscow: "...He [Rees] did not cooperate.  Nothing happened actually."  ...My father was supposed to provide political hearsay but that he did not co-operate, and after the Soviet-German pact nothing more was heard from him.

Works
Books
The Summer Flood (1932)
Where No Wounds Were (1950)
A Bundle of Sensations: Sketches in Autobiography (1961)
Multimillionaires: Six Studies in Wealth (1961)
The Rhine (1967)
St Michael: A History of Marks & Spencer (1969)
The Great Slump: Capitalism in Crisis 1929–1933 (1970) (review)
Conversations with Kafka by Gustav Janouch (1970) (translator)
A Chapter of Accidents (1972)
Brief Encounters (1974)

Articles

New York Review of Books:
 "Inside the Aquarium," (1967)

The Spectator:
 "Pity," (1936)
 "Children From Spain," (1937)
 "In Defence of Welsh Nationalism," (1937)
 "The Unpeopled Spaces," (1937)
 "Standards of Greatness," (1938)
 "The Spectre," (1948)
 "Supreme Commander," (1949)
 "The Informer and the Communist," (1953)

See also
 Guy Burgess
 Whittaker Chambers
 The Spectator
 Aberystwyth University

References

Sources

External links
 From Warfare to Welfare (MYGLYW) - Goronwy Rees (1909-1979)
 Archives Wales - Goronwy Rees Papers
 Archives Wales - Goronwy Rees Enquiry Papers
 Page at Spartacus
 *

1909 births
1979 deaths
Welsh military personnel
20th-century Welsh writers
Welsh-speaking journalists
Welsh communists
Soviet spies
British spies for the Soviet Union
Welsh journalists
Vice-Chancellors of Aberystwyth University
British Army personnel of World War II
Royal Artillery personnel
Royal Welch Fusiliers officers